The 16th Racquetball World Championships were held in Santo Domingo (Dominican Republic) from August 3 to 11, 2012, with players from 22 different countries. 

The championships had two parts. First,  individual competitions for men's and women's singles and doubles, which took place over the first four days. Then following an off day, there was a team competition on the last three days in which countries competed against each other in a best of three match format involving two singles matches and a doubles match. 

This is the second time the Racquetball World Championships were held in Santo Domingo. The previous time was 2006. 

The 2012 World Racquetball Championships were also the qualifying event for the 2013 World Games in Cali, Colombia. The top 16 players in Santo Domingo will qualify to compete in Cali. This only applies to men's and women's singles as the World Games will not have doubles competitions. 



Medal table

Men's Singles Competition

Women's Singles Competition

Men's Doubles Competition

Women's Doubles Competition

Men's team competition

Women's team competition

See also
Indian racquetball team
Racquetball World Championships

References

External links
IRF Website

Racquetball World Championships
Racquetball World Championships
2012 in Dominican Republic sport
International sports competitions hosted by the Dominican Republic
Racquetball in the Dominican Republic